Halieutopsis bathyoreos, also known as the broad-snout deepsea batfish, is a species of fish in the family Ogcocephalidae.

It is found in the Pacific Ocean just off Japan, the Hawaiian Islands, and New Zealand.

Etymology
The fish is named as from a species of a deep mountain.

References

Ogcocephalidae
Marine fish genera
Fish described in 1988
Taxa named by Margaret G. Bradbury